Celebrity Jigs n' Reels was an Irish reality entertainment television show broadcast on RTÉ One. It was produced by Mind The Gap Films.

Format
The series started out with seven celebrities paired with professional Irish dancers. Each week they were given a contemporary Irish rock or pop song (as chosen by producers), to which the professional Irish dancer had to choreograph a traditional Irish dance. They would then dance for the judges, who would give feedback and subsequently award points. The dancers then faced a public vote, with the two couples who received the lowest number of votes having to face the judges again. When the judges revealed the number of points they were awarding, the couple with the lower score were eliminated.

Series one

Series one launched in March 2006, in the slot regularly occupied by You're a Star. With a mix of high-profile celebrities such as the singer Dana and Olympic gold medallist Michael Carruth, as well as relative unknowns, such as Emma O'Driscoll and Suzanne Walshe, the show slowly climbed the ratings and achieved a reported 43 per cent audience share. The following year in March 2007 with more high-profile celebrities it was Gavin Ó Fearraigh actor and model from the Irish TV drama Ros na Rún who won the crown along with his dance partner Dearbhla Lennon.

Judges
Jean Butler, George Hook, Colin Dunne, Robert O'Byrne

Celebrities and dancers
Gavin Ó Fearraigh and Dearbhla Lennon (winners)(2007)
Killian O'Sullivan and Nicola Byrne (winners)(2006)
Dana and Ronan McCormack (2nd place)
Paul Byrom and Susan Ginnety (3rd place)
Michael Carruth and Dearbhla Lennon (4th place)
Jen Kelly and Paula Goulding (5th place)
Emma O'Driscoll and Mick Donegan (6th place)
Suzanne Walshe and Scott Porter (7th place)
Kevin Dundon and Rachel Byrne – 2007

New Year's Party
On 31 December 2006, Celebrity Jigs n'Reels returned to ring Ireland into the New Year live on RTÉ One. Seven brand new celebrities danced for one night only to raise money for charity and bring in 2007. The format differed from series one in that no celebrity represented a specific charity; instead all the money raised went to Focus Ireland and The Simon Community, both of which look after the homeless. Hilda Fay (from Fair City) was crowned champion, beating former Big Brother star Ray Shah, model Celia Holman Lee, GAA All Star Oisín McConville, and ex Pogues bassist Cait O'Riordan.

The results show ran for an extended period of 50 minutes and included a live singing performance from Paul Byrom (second runner up from series one), as well as a four-minute ensemble dance routine from the shows professional dancers. The results show also marked the return of 2006 winner Killian O'Sullivan, who danced with his former partner Nicola Byrne to the Scissor Sisters track "I Don't Feel Like Dancin'". This marked the first time a song by a non-Irish artist or band was featured in the show.

The New Year's Party show stood out as it was the first live show to ring in the New Year on RTÉ in more than five years. In previous years recorded shows were played "as live" on 31 December and usually involved a standard format of musical entertainment and chat with an invited audience.

Judges
Jean Butler, George Hook, Colin Dunne

Panellist Robert O'Byrne did not return for the New Year's Special.

External links
 Celebrity Jigs 'n' Reels at RTÉ Television

2006 Irish television series debuts
2007 Irish television series endings
Irish variety television shows
RTÉ original programming